The following is a list of women who are the Principal Investigators (PIs), Project Scientists (PSs) or Directors (Dirs) of astronomical instruments, missions or observatories.

References 

 
Women planetary scientists
Planetary scientists
Lists of women scientists
Astronomers